The 1900–01 Indiana Hoosiers men's basketball team represented Indiana University in its first season of collegiate basketball. The head coach was James H. Horne, who was in his first and only year. The team played its home games at the Old Assembly Hall in Bloomington, Indiana, as an independent school. Indiana did not officially compete in basketball as a member of the Western Conference, later known as the Big Ten Conference, until the 1904–1905 season.

The Hoosiers finished the regular season with an overall record of 1–4.

Team formation
During the 1900–01 school year, Indiana University officials desired to compete with rival schools in "basket ball," as it was then known. So after the holiday break at the end of 1900, athletic director James H. Horne put out a call for players to try out for the new team. To prepare players participated in drills and scrimmages daily. Horne served as the team's coach and Thomas Records as the team manager. Six of the best players were selected to play varsity.

Roster

Indiana was led in scoring by sophomore captain Ernest Strange. The 1900–1901 season would be the only one for Strange, who died in a boiler explosion in the summer of 1901. Darby, the starting center, would return for the 1901–1902 season as the team's captain, coach, and leading scorer.

Schedule

|-
!colspan=8| Regular Season
|-

Game Summaries

Butler: February 8
Indiana's first official basketball game took place on Friday, February 8, 1901, at 3:00 p.m. when the Hoosiers took on Butler at the Indianapolis YMCA gymnasium. 100 of the team's fans joined them on a train to watch. According to Indiana Daily Student reports, "the excitement approached that of an inter-collegiate football contest." However, the superior performance of Butler's star forward Carl McGaughey ultimately helped propel Butler to a 20–17 victory.

Butler: February 21
Indiana and Butler scheduled a return match-up on Thursday, February 21 in Bloomington. Phelps Darby, who was 5 feet 11 inches tall, had played center in the initial game, but for the re-match he was moved to the forward position so that he could guard Butler's Carl McGaughey. McGaughey still managed to score five field goals in the first half to give Butler a 16–6 advantage at halftime. Indiana rallied behind the play of team captain, Ernest Strange, but still lost 24–20. McGaughey was scoreless in the second half but still led all players with 10 points. For Indiana, Strange and Fitzgerald each had six points.

Purdue: March 2
On Saturday, March 2 in Bloomington, Indiana played Purdue. The two schools had already developed a fierce rivalry in football. Purdue edged out the Hoosiers in the first half with a 12–10 lead and was able to hold on to the lead with a 20–15 victory. Purdue went on to have a 12–0 season and was considered by some to be the best team in the country; however, Yale won the Helms Foundation award that year.

Wabash: March 8
Indiana's fourth game of the year was against Wabash, who traveled to Bloomington on March 8. The game was close after the first half with Indiana ahead 9–8. But in the second half Indiana arguably played its best basketball of the season by scoring 17 points to win by a total score of 26–17.

Disputed Purdue game
Indiana originally planned to play away games at Wabash and Purdue, but according to the Arbutus (the school yearbook), those games were "declared off, and the season ended at Indiana." The official records of Indiana University and Purdue University indicate that Indiana lost to Purdue 23–19 in West Lafayette on March 15, 1901. However, the Indiana University Basketball Encyclopedia by Jason Hiner notes that an absence of newspaper reports about the game suggests that it never took place. That source lists the team's record for the inaugural season as 1–3.

References

Indiana
Indiana Hoosiers men's basketball seasons
Indiana Hoosiers
Indiana Hoosiers